Esna is a village in Roosna-Alliku Parish, Järva County in northern-central Estonia.

Notable people 
 Ekaterina Kalinina, Estonian Old Bolshevik and spouse of the Soviet head of state Mikhail Kalinin

References

 

Villages in Järva County